George Butterworth (1946–2000) was a British professor of psychology, who studied infant development.

Life and work 
After completing his D.Phil. at Oxford, Butterworth took a post at Southampton University, moving to a chair in psychology at Stirling in 1985, before coming to Sussex in 1991. He was appointed honorary professor, University of East London, in 1996.

His contributions to the discipline include founding both the British Infancy Research Group and the Journal Developmental Science, as well as heading numerous groups ranging from the Scientific Affairs Board of the British Psychological Society to the European Society for Developmental Psychology.

Selected publications 
 Butterworth, George, Julie Rutkowska, and Michael Scaife. Evolution and developmental psychology. Vol. 4. Harvester, 1985.

Articles, a selection:
 Butterworth, George, and Nicholas Jarrett. "What minds have in common is space: Spatial mechanisms serving joint visual attention in infancy." British journal of developmental psychology 9.1 (1991): 55–72.
 Carpenter, Malinda, et al. "Social cognition, joint attention, and communicative competence from 9 to 15 months of age." Monographs of the society for research in child development (1998): i-174.

References 

1946 births
2000 deaths
British psychologists
Child psychologists
20th-century British medical doctors
20th-century British psychologists